Fireflies is an Australian television show which aired on the Australian Broadcasting Corporation (ABC) in Australia and RTÉ One in Ireland. It debuted on 7 February 2004 and screened as 22 episodes. The series was set in the fictional country town of Lost River, population 487. The location was the actual Hunter Valley town of Wollombi, and other scenes are set in the district and along the southern end of the Putty Road to Singleton.  It was centred on the lives of a group of volunteer firefighters, during the hottest, driest summer in decades. The theme song "Beautiful Feeling" was written and performed by Paul Kelly.

Songs and music
All the songs and music used on Fireflies was written, produced, and sung by Paul Kelly.
 Change Your Mind
 Beautiful Feeling
 Foggy Highway
 Just About to Break
 I Wasted Time
 You Broke a Beautiful Thing
 Beautiful Promise
 Boon Companion
 If I Could Start Today Again
 I Smell Trouble
 Emotional
 My Way is to You
 Your Lovin' is On My Mind
 Give Into My Love
 View From the Ridge
 Making Hay While the Sun Shines
 Beggar on the Street of Love
 Midnight Rain
 Take Your Time
 The Lion and the lamb
 Nothing Lost, Nothing Gained
 To Be Good Takes a Long time (To Be Bad No Time at All)
 Last Train to Heaven
 Everybody Wants to Touch Me
 Smoke Under the Bridge
 These are the Days
 Sure Got Me
 Taught by Experts
 Rally 'Round the Drum
 Be Careful What You Pray For
 Difficult Woman
 You're So Fine

Cast
 Russell Kiefel as Sharpie
 Anna Hruby as Rebekah Sharp
 Libby Tanner as Lil Yengill
 Jeremy Sims as Tim 'Bakka' Burke
 Natasha Novak as Svettie Burke
 John Waters as Perry Luscombe
 Abe Forsythe as Hank Sharp
 Steve Rodgers as Constable Mike Jones
 Nadia Townsend as Fifi Sharp
 Christopher Morris as Joey Burke
 Edmund Cinis as Carter
 Keeara Byrnes as Candy
 Hayley McInerney as Taz Luscombe
 Rhonda Doyle as Ali
 Ashley Fitzgerald as Noodle
 Kain O'Keeffe as Kieran Sharp
 Peter Lamb as Eris
 Barbara Angell as Mena
 Bradley Byquar as Patto
 Helen O'Leary as Luisa
 Russell Newman as Jeff Burke
 Stephen Leeder as Bryce

Sources:

Guest cast
 Phil Bradac as Firie
 Erich Thill as Bikie
 Larry O'Carroll as Larry
 Tanya Randolf as Tanya
 Ros Bailey as Reggie
 Rob Steele as Stewart MacTavish
 Kim Knuckey as Noel McKinley
 Scott Pollard as Steve
 Janice Oxenbould as Peg
 Keith Agius as Morgan Long
 Tony Eastley as Newsreader
 Stephen Holt as Ginge
 Sandy Ireland as Suzie
 Jie Pitman as Nathan "Rolly" Patterson
 Ling-Hsueh Tang as KC
 Shayne Francis as Donna Bruce
 Lyn Lee as Val
 Johann Walraven as Ziggy
 Rob Carlton as Kewie Holman
 Kaitlyn Cox as Hotel Receptionist
 Kevin Donohue as Fly
 Stan Kouros as Maurice Badroek
 Toby Levins as Roy
 Anne-marie Mazza as Juno Hardcliffe
 Ian McColm as Laggan Firie
 Jimmy Pike as Johnny Blunt
 Cameron Wade as himself (Cameron Wade)
 Rowan Webb as Firie #1
 John Whitman as Musician #1
 Mark Duffy as Fire Investigator

Sources:

List of episodes

Home media 

It was announced by Via Vision Entertainment in April 2019 that they would be releasing the complete collection of Firefiles on DVD.

See also
 List of Australian television series

References

2004 Australian television series debuts
2004 Australian television series endings
Australian drama television series
Australian Broadcasting Corporation original programming
Television series by Endemol Australia
Television shows set in Sydney